Pedro Henrique Morio Sakamoto (born 29 June 1993) is a Brazilian tennis player.

Sakamoto has a career high ATP singles ranking of 284 achieved on 24 February 2020. He also has a career high doubles ranking of 272 achieved on 3 February 2020. Sakamoto has won two ITF Futures singles tournaments and ten ITF Futures doubles tournaments.

Sakamoto made his ATP main draw debut at the 2019 Brasil Open, where he qualified for the main draw defeating Matteo Donati and Carlos Berlocq.

Challenger and Futures/World Tennis Tour Finals

Singles: 12 (4-8)

References

External links
 
 

1993 births
Living people
Brazilian male tennis players
People from Guarulhos
Sportspeople from Rio de Janeiro (city)
Brazilian people of Japanese descent
21st-century Brazilian people
20th-century Brazilian people